Jayakumar or Jeyakumar is a Sinhalese and Indian surname. It consists of two parts: jaya, which means victory in Sinhalese and is also the name of a Hindu demigod, and kumar, meaning child, son or prince. The name may refer to the following notable people:

K. Jayakumar, Indian civil servant
R. V. Jayakumar, Indian doctor and Professor of endocrinology
S. Jayakumar (Singaporean politician), Singaporean Member of Parliament
S. Jayakumar (Indian politician), Indian Member of Legislative Assembly
K. Jeyakumar, Indian politician
Michael Jeyakumar Devaraj, Malaysian politician

References

Sinhalese surnames